Moon Byul-yi, more commonly known by the mononym Moonbyul, is a South Korean rapper, songwriter, and composer signed under RBW. She debuted as a member of the South Korean girl group Mamamoo in June 2016, and later formed a duo with Solar as Mamamoo+ in August 2022. Moonbyul co-writes a majority of Mamamoo's output alongside the other members. As of January 2023, the Korea Music Copyright Association has 111 songs listed under her name, unless stated otherwise.

2014

2015

2016

2017

2018

2019

2020

2021

2022

See also
 List of songs recorded by Mamamoo

Notes

References 

Moonbyul
Moonbyul